Filthy Rich & Catflap is a BBC sitcom produced in 1986 and broadcast in 1987. The series featured former The Young Ones co-stars Nigel Planer, Rik Mayall and Adrian Edmondson as its three title characters. It was written by Ben Elton (with additional material credited to Mayall), and produced and directed by Paul Jackson (who also directed The Young Ones), with film sequences directed by Ed Bye. The show's music was written by Peter Brewis. One series consisting of six half-hour episodes was produced. Despite the continuity announcer saying that the show would return the following year, only one series was ever made due to a fall-out between Mayall and Elton over creative control.

The series enjoyed a resurgence of interest in 2004 when it was officially released on DVD by independent DVD production company Playback. The VHS and DVD versions were cut for musical rights. Cuts included Richie singing "Where Is Love?", "Morning Has Broken", and "Consider Yourself"; and Eddie singing "Roxanne", "You've Got to Pick a Pocket or Two", and "Message in a Bottle". A 25th-anniversary DVD was released in 2012.

Characters
Ralph Filthy (Nigel Planer): Richie's showbiz agent. He is sleazy and sickly and has, to quote writer Elton, "the morals of a dog caught short on a croquet lawn" (a line he would re-use as the tag line for his 1989 novel Stark). Quote: "Boys. It's not often I get excited but right now I feel like I've been locked in an off-licence". His speech is peppered with Polari and he refers to Richie as "Daughter"; his lapel also features a blue rose, a symbol of a quest for the impossible.
Gertrude Richard "Richie" Rich (Rik Mayall): a half-witted perennially "resting" (out of work) comedian/TV presenter whose most prominent work to date includes links on TVS. Despite this, he considers himself a "veritable superstar" and has paranoid delusions about everyone he meets wanting to either cash in on his fame or assassinate him. Hence, he hires a bodyguard.
Edward Didgeridoo Catflap (Adrian Edmondson): Richie's faithless minder; permanently drunk, disloyal and violent. Occasionally, Catflap holds up the pretence of being Richie's best friend, although this is usually for personal gain. (Edmondson's character in Bottom, Eddie Hitler, is similar but not identical.)

Summary
During the run of the series Richie kills several milkmen, Eddie blackmails Richie with a paternity suit scam, Ralph gets sent to prison and hanged, Richie is blackmailed by the Nolan Sisters, they spoof newspaper tycoon Rupert Murdoch and feature bodyguards wearing Federation Stormtrooper uniforms that previously featured in the sci-fi show Blake's 7. Richie appeared as a guest on a panel game called Ooer!! Sounds a Bit Rude!, which bore more than a passing resemblance to the BBC quiz show Blankety Blank. Richie finally becomes famous by slandering everyone in showbiz and becoming the only person censors deem clean enough to host every show on television (precisely everybody, from the "A-list" names down to the entire cast of Grange Hill). This leads to a song-and-dance routine from Richie, celebrating the fact that, in his words, he has "made it!"

As well as the Nolans, other people appearing as "themselves" included Midge Ure and Anne Diamond (then an anchor woman for breakfast TV station TV-am; it was rare at that time for the BBC to mention rival channels). The show also featured cameos by Barbara Windsor, Lynda Bellingham and Jools Holland. Contemporaries from the alternative comedy scene who also appeared include Stephen Fry, Hugh Laurie, Helen Lederer, Gareth Hale, Norman Pace, Arthur Smith, Mel Smith, Chris Barrie, Lee Cornes, David Baddiel, Andy de la Tour, John Bird and Harry Enfield. Many of these guests had previously appeared in The Young Ones.

Episodes

References

External links

Filthy, Rich & Catflap at British TV Comedy

1980s British sitcoms
1987 British television series debuts
1987 British television series endings
BBC television sitcoms
Television series about television
Television shows set in London
Television series created by Ben Elton
English-language television shows